The Construction History Society (not to be confused with the Construction History Society of America) is a learned society that promotes the international study of the history of construction. Though based in Britain, it is interested in the history of construction of all countries and particularly how those histories inter-relate. A key aim is the preservation of the primary records of construction companies and individuals.  The society publishes a peer-reviewed journal – Construction History – twice a year; and a magazine – The Construction Historian – as and when it can. It hosts an annual conference at Cambridge University and supports the triennial conferences if its sister organisations worldwide.

The society has approximately 350 members, drawn from all parts of the world, and is managed by a board of trustees, all of whom give their time freely. The society is a registered charity and its registered address is the Department of Architecture and Art History at Cambridge University.

History
The society was formed as the Construction History Group in 1983, but later changed its name to the Construction History Society. It has sponsored three international conferences on the history of construction at Queens' College, Cambridge University, and supported by the Cambridge School of Architecture, in 2014, 2015, and 2016. The society is a registered charity.

The chairman is Dr. James W.P. Campbell of the University of Cambridge.

Journal
The society has published a peer-reviewed journal, Construction History, since 1985 which is abstracted and indexed in the Arts & Humanities Citation Index, SCOPUS and the Web of Science.

References

External links

History of construction
Charities based in England
Learned societies of the United Kingdom
1983 establishments in the United Kingdom
Construction organizations